Bank of Maharashtra is a central public sector bank under the ownership of Ministry of Finance, Government of India. It is headquartered in Pune. The bank had 29 million customers across the country with 2022 branches as of March 2022. It has the largest network of branches of any central public sector undertakings in the state of Maharashtra. The total business of the bank crossed ₹ 3,15,620 lakh crore as on 31 December 2021.

History
The bank was founded by V.G.Kale and D. K. Sathe in Pune. It provided financial assistance to small business and gave birth to many industrial houses. The bank was nationalised in 1969.

A. S Rajeev assumed charge as Managing Director & CEO of the bank on 2 December 2018. A.B. Vijayakumar joined as Executive Director on 10 March 2021. Asheesh Pandey joined as Executive Director on 31 December 2021.

Allen C Pereira, Former Chairman of Bank of Maharashtra was responsible for having opened several branches of the branch in the North East Zones of India where the bank had no presence and helped scaling up.

See also

 Banking in India
 List of banks in India
 Reserve Bank of India
 Indian Financial System Code
 List of largest banks
 List of companies of India
 Make in India

References

External links
 

Public Sector Banks in India
Banks established in 1935
Financial services companies based in Pune
Companies nationalised by the Government of India
Indian companies established in 1935
Companies listed on the National Stock Exchange of India
Companies listed on the Bombay Stock Exchange